The 1850 Connecticut gubernatorial election was held on April 1, 1850. Former congressman and Democratic Party nominee Thomas H. Seymour defeated former state legislator and Whig nominee Lafayette S. Foster with 48.11% of the vote. 

Seymour won a plurality of the vote, but he did not receive a majority. As a result, the Connecticut General Assembly elected the governor, per the state constitution. Seymour won the vote over Foster 122 to 108 in the General Assembly, and became the governor. The constitutional inauguration date was May 1, and Seymour was inaugurated on May 4, possibly due to delays over the state legislature vote.

General election

Candidates
Major party candidates

Thomas H. Seymour, Democratic
Lafayette S. Foster, Whig

Minor party candidates

John Boyd, Free Soil

Results

References

1850
Connecticut
Gubernatorial